Gypsochares kyraensis is a moth of the family Pterophoridae that is found in Russia (the South Siberian Mountains).

References

Moths described in 1996
Oidaematophorini
Endemic fauna of Russia